The Armenian Church is an Armenian Apostolic church located at 43 Carol I Boulevard in Bucharest, Romania. It is dedicated to the Archangels Michael and Gabriel.

Presentation 

The design resembles Etchmiadzin Cathedral. Work was completed in September 1915. In the yard, the surrounding complex includes a bishop's residence, a library and diocesan museum, a cultural center, a kindergarten, and the Union of Armenians of Romania headquarters.

The church is listed as a historic monument by Romania's Ministry of Culture and Religious Affairs, as are the library and the statue of Andranik.

Notes

Churches in Bucharest
Historic monuments in Bucharest
Bucharest
Churches completed in 1915
20th-century churches in Romania